Vadakkan Pattukal (literally, the ballads of the north) are a collection of Malayalam ballads from the medieval period. The songs present stories of heroes such as Aromal Chekavar and Thacholi Othenan, and heroines like
Unniyarcha. The stories centre round the fortunes of two families, Puthooram family and Thacholi Manikkoth family. Though two families belong to two different communities Thiyyar and Nair respectively, they share in common the martial traditional. The chief among the Thiyyar chieftains of Puthooram was Aromal Chekavar, who had been killed by Chanthu in his first duel (Ankam). His sister Attumanamel Unniyarcha, is equally adept in the use of arms. The exploits of the Nair chieftain Thacholi Othenan belonging to the Thacholi family form the theme of several ballads. Thacholi Chandu, Palattu Komappan, Putumada Kelu, Karumparambil Kannan are some of the other warriors who figure in the ballads.  They exemplify the heights of folk-poetry and are also sometimes associated with deities. Almost all these ballads show strong connections to Kalaripayattu. The oldest compositions do not date earlier than 16th century but their idiom and vocabulary seem older. However, like any other oral cultural forms that are sung by communities even today, these songs show great flexibility and a repetitive pattern in their lexicon that is typical of the simplicity of folksongs in general.

References

Ballads
Indian folk songs
Ezhava
Malayalam-language songs
Malayalam-language literature
Kerala folklore